The Blue Ensign is a flag, one of several British ensigns, used by certain organisations or territories associated or formerly associated with the United Kingdom. It is used either plain or  defaced with a  badge or other emblem.

The evolution of the Blue Ensign followed that of the Union Jack. The ensign originated in the 17th century with the St George's cross (the Flag of England) in the canton, and with a blue field.

The Acts of Union 1707 united England and Wales with Scotland in the Kingdom of Great Britain, thus producing a new Blue Ensign with the new Union Flag in the canton. With the Act of Union 1800,  Ireland became a part of the new United Kingdom of Great Britain and Ireland, and St Patrick's Cross was incorporated into the Union Flag and, accordingly, into the cantons of all British ensigns from 1 January 1801.

Plain Blue Ensign
Prior to the reorganisation of the Royal Navy in 1864, the plain blue ensign had been the ensign of one of three squadrons of the Royal Navy, the Blue Squadron. This changed in 1864, when an order in council provided that the Red Ensign was allocated to merchantmen, the Blue Ensign was to be the flag of ships in public service or commanded by an officer in the Royal Naval Reserve, and the White Ensign was allocated to the Navy.

Thus, after 1864, the plain blue ensign (i.e., without any defacement or modification) is permitted to be worn, instead of the Red Ensign, by three categories of civilian vessel:

 British merchant vessels whose officers and crew include a certain number of retired Royal Navy personnel or Royal Naval Reservists, or are commanded by an officer of the Royal Naval Reserve in possession of a Government warrant. The number and rank of such crew members required has varied over the years, as have the additional conditions required, since the system was first introduced in 1864.
 Royal Research Ships by warrant whether crewed by former Royal Navy personnel or Merchant Navy personnel.
 British-registered yachts belonging to members of the following yacht clubs:

Hornet Services Sailing Club
Royal Naval Club and Royal Albert Yacht Club
Royal Brighton Yacht Club, Victoria
Royal Cinque Ports Yacht Club 
Royal Cruising Club
Royal Dorset Yacht Club
Royal Engineer Yacht Club 
Royal Geelong Yacht Club, Victoria
Royal Gourock Yacht Club 
Royal Highland Yacht Club 
Royal Marines Sailing Club
Royal Melbourne Yacht Squadron, Victoria
Royal Motor Yacht Club 
Royal Naval Sailing Association 
Royal Naval Volunteer Reserve Yacht Club 
Royal New Zealand Yacht Squadron
Royal Perth Yacht Club, Western Australia
Royal Northern and Clyde Yacht Club  
Royal Port Nicholson Yacht Club, New Zealand
Royal Queensland Yacht Squadron
Royal Scottish Motor Yacht Club
Royal Solent Yacht Club
Royal South Australia Yacht Squadron
Royal Southern Yacht Club
Royal Sydney Yacht Squadron, New South Wales
Royal Temple Yacht Club
Royal Thames Yacht Club
Royal Victorian Motor Yacht Club
Royal Welsh Yacht Club   
Royal Western Yacht Club of England
Royal Western Yacht Club of Scotland
Royal Yacht Club of Tasmania
Royal Yacht Club of Victoria
Sussex Motor Yacht Club

Permission for yachts to wear the blue ensign (and other special yachting ensigns) was suspended during both World War I and World War II.

Defaced Blue Ensign
Since 1864, the Blue Ensign is defaced with a badge or emblem, to form the ensign of United Kingdom government departments or public bodies. Current defaced Blue Ensigns (besides yacht clubs listed below) are:
 

Royal Air Force marine vessels (such as seaplane tenders) flew a defaced blue ensign with an eagle and anchor.

Yachting Blue Ensigns defaced by the badge of the club were recorded in the Navy List until 1985, and now they are administered by the Royal Yachting Association for the Ministry of Defence. Current defaced Blue Ensigns are:

Flags of the Crown Dependencies using defaced Blue Ensigns
 Government Ensign of Alderney
 Government Ensign of Guernsey
 Government Ensign of Jersey

Flags of British Overseas Territories using defaced Blue Ensigns
Current flags:
 Flag of Anguilla
 Government Ensign of Bermuda (the flag commonly used on land is Bermuda's Red Ensign)
 Flag of the British Virgin Islands
 Flag of the Cayman Islands
 Flag of the Falkland Islands
 Government Ensign of Gibraltar (there is another flag, not based on an ensign, that is commonly used on land)
 Flag of Montserrat
 Flag of Pitcairn Islands
 Flag of Saint Helena
 Flag of Turks and Caicos Islands

Former flags:
The defaced blue ensign was formerly used as:

National flags based on the Blue Ensign
These include:
 Flag of Australia
 Flag of New South Wales
 Flag of Queensland
 Flag of South Australia
 Flag of Tasmania
 Flag of Victoria
 Flag of Western Australia
 Flag of Fiji (light blue)
 Flag of New Zealand
 Flag of the Cook Islands
 Flag of Tuvalu (light blue)

Other flags based on the Blue Ensign
 Flag of Ceylon
Ensign of The Royal Hospital School
 George Rex Flag
 Tanganyika Territory blue ensign
 Fijian government ensign
 Fijian customs ensign
 Flag of Australasia team at the Olympic games
 Flag of the Blood 148 Kainai Nation of Alberta, Canada

See also

 Ensign
 Red Ensign
 White Ensign
 Green Ensign
 Australian flag debate
 New Zealand flag debate
 Historical flags of the British Empire and the overseas territories

References
Notes

Footnotes

External links

 Blue Ensign page on the "Flags of the World" website
 UK, Naval, Government, Yacht clubs on flags.net

Flags of the United Kingdom
British Empire